Marcus Lavon Trufant (born December 25, 1980) is a former American football player who was a cornerback in the National Football League (NFL) for ten seasons.  He played college football for Washington State University, and was chosen by the Seattle Seahawks 11th overall in the 2003 NFL Draft.

From 2010 to 2012, Trufant helped mentor the young Seahawks secondary that became known as the Legion of Boom.

Early years
A native of Tacoma, Washington, Trufant attended McCarver Elementary School and Truman Middle School. While attending Wilson High School in Tacoma, Trufant lettered in three varsity sports: football, basketball and track, capturing ninth at the State track meet in triple jump, with a leap of 14.50 meters. He was the team captain for two teams as a senior. As a junior, was Offensive Player of the Year in football and Mr. Defense in basketball. As a senior, he was named All-State by the Associated Press, the Seattle Post-Intelligencer and Washington Prep Report. Named Washington AAAA player of the year by The News Tribune as well as the Seattle PI and The Seattle Times All-League, All-Area and All-State teams. Lost the State AAAA championship as a senior and scored 30 TD and rushed for 1,800 yards on offense while recording 48 tackles and 8 interceptions on defense.

College career
Trufant attended Washington State University after being recruited by then-Washington State Cougars football head coach Mike Price.  He started for all four years for the Cougars and was a member of the 2003 Rose Bowl team that lost to the Oklahoma Sooners in his 2002 senior year.  He did not allow a single touchdown against him for his last two years there.  As a freshman in 1999, he was a freshman All-Pac-10 selection.

Awards and honors
 Pac-10 All-Freshman (1999)
 Honorable mention All-Pac-10 (2001)
 First-team All-Pac-10 (2002)
 Second-team AP All-American (2002)

Professional career

2003 NFL Combine

Seattle Seahawks
Trufant was selected by the Seattle Seahawks with the 11th overall pick in the 2003 NFL Draft. Coming from Tacoma and graduating from Washington State University, Trufant is considered a hometown favorite.  In 2007 Trufant played a big part in the Seahawks defense, intercepting a career-high 7 passes and returning one for an 84-yard touchdown. He also deflected 15 passes and made 85 tackles, and was voted into the 2008 Pro Bowl in Hawaii. On February 21, 2008 the Seahawks placed their franchise tag on Trufant, tendering him with a one-year $9.465 million deal.

On March 26, 2008 the Seahawks signed Trufant to a new six-year, $50.2 million deal with a $10 million signing bonus.

On October 17, 2011, Trufant was placed on injured reserve with a bruised sacrum, ending his season. The Seahawks released Trufant on March 8, 2012, but re-signed him one month and one day later on April 9, 2012 to a one-year contract.

Jacksonville Jaguars
On May 7, 2013, Trufant signed a contract with the Jacksonville Jaguars, reuniting him with his former defensive coordinator Gus Bradley. Trufant, Matt Hasselbeck and Leroy Hill were the last remaining players from the Seahawks' 2005 NFC championship season. He was released on August 30, 2013.

Retirement
On April 23, 2014, Trufant signed a one-day contract so that he could retire as a Seattle Seahawk.

Career statistics

Key
 GP: games played
 COMB: combined tackles
 TOTAL: total tackles
 AST: assisted tackles
 SACK: sacks
 FF: forced fumbles
 FR: fumble recoveries
 FR YDS: fumble return yards 
 INT: interceptions
 IR YDS: interception return yards
 AVG IR: average interception return
 LNG: longest interception return
 TD: interceptions returned for touchdown
 PD: passes defensed

Personal life
Trufant's younger brother, Isaiah Trufant, has also played in the NFL.

His youngest brother, Desmond, was drafted by the Atlanta Falcons in the 2013 NFL Draft. He started at the cornerback position as a true freshman for the University of Washington in 2009 and remained a starter through his senior year in 2012.

References

External links
 Seattle Seahawks bio

1980 births
Living people
American football cornerbacks
Jacksonville Jaguars players
Seattle Seahawks players
Washington State Cougars football players
National Conference Pro Bowl players
Players of American football from Tacoma, Washington
African-American players of American football
20th-century African-American sportspeople
21st-century African-American sportspeople